3 Acts of Murder is a 2009 Australian television film directed by Rowan Woods. It is based on the true-life story of how author Arthur Upfield inadvertently inspired The Murchison Murders.

The film starred Robert Menzies as Upfield and Luke Ford as Snowy. It also starred Bille Brown and Emma Booth.

It screened on the Australian Broadcasting Corporation on 14 June 2009 at 8.30pm and again in September 2013, October 2014 and August 2015.

References

External links
 Three Acts of Murder at IMDb
 Review at Sydney Morning Herald

Australian films based on actual events
Australian television films
2009 television films
2009 films
Films set in Western Australia
2000s Australian films